The 1952–53 Duke Blue Devils men's basketball team represented Duke University during the 1952–53 men's college basketball season.

Schedule

References

Duke Blue Devils men's basketball seasons
Duke
1952 in sports in North Carolina
1953 in sports in North Carolina